Augusto Hidalgo Macario (born 10 May 1972) is a Spanish Socialist Workers' Party (PSOE) politician. He was elected to the city council of Las Palmas in the Canary Islands in 2007 and became its mayor in 2015.

Biography
Born in Las Palmas in the Canary Islands. Through the National University of Distance Education (UNED), he graduated in Political Sciences and Sociology, and earned master's degrees in Prevention of Occupational Hazards and Training of Trainers. His father, Augusto Hidalgo Champsaur, was labour lawyer and anti-Francoist activist. According to his own official online biography, the younger Hidalgo was suspended from school at the age of 14 for going on strike.

Hidalgo's early years of political activity were spent in the Canarian United Left (IUC) and the Canarian Initiative (Icán). He led the former's list in the Las Palmas constituency for the 2000 Spanish general election. After leaving politics for the private sector, he returned and was elected to Las Palmas city hall in the 2007 elections, representing the Spanish Socialist Workers' Party (PSOE). In 2011, he retained his seat and was also elected to the Gran Canaria Island Council.

In October 2014, Hidalgo won the primary to be the PSOE candidate for mayor of Las Palmas in the 2015 election. In June, he succeeded the People's Party (PP) incumbent Juan José Cardona as mayor, with support from Podemos and local left-wing party New Canaries. The three-way pact was repeated in 2019. In 2015, his was the second-largest city governed by the PSOE, after Seville; news agency EFE named him as a representative of a wave of progressive mayors elected that year while saying that he differed from his contemporaries such as Abel Caballero (Vigo) and José María González Santos (Cádiz) in having a more reserved personality and approach.

As of 2019, Hidalgo is married and has a daughter.

References

1972 births
Living people
People from Las Palmas
National University of Distance Education alumni
United Left (Spain) politicians
Spanish Socialist Workers' Party politicians
Mayors of places in the Canary Islands